The 1892 South Derbyshire by-election was held on 4 March 1892 after the death of the incumbent Liberal MP Harrington Evans Broad.  The election was won by the Liberal candidate, Harrington Evans Broad.

References 

By-elections to the Parliament of the United Kingdom in Derbyshire constituencies
March 1892 events
1892 elections in the United Kingdom
1892 in England
19th century in Derbyshire